The Salt Tax Revolt was an armed conflict between the indigenous communities of Huanta and the Peruvian Army that lasted from August 30, 1896, to May 1897.

Wars involving Peru
19th-century rebellions